Grønfjelldalen is a valley in the municipality of Rana in Nordland county, Norway.  It is a side valley off of the main Dunderland Valley.  The river Grønfjellåga runs from the lake Kallvatnet down through the valley, flowing into the main river Ranelva near Grønnfjelldal Station.

References

Valleys of Nordland
Rana, Norway